The 2014–15 FC Augsburg season was the 108th season in the football club's history and fourth consecutive season in the top flight of German football, the Bundesliga, having been promoted from the 2. Bundesliga in 2011. FC Augsburg also participated in the season's edition of the DFB-Pokal. It was the sixth season for FC Augsburg in the SGL arena.

Having finished fifth in Bundesliga, FC Augsburg also qualified for the UEFA Europa League for the first time in the club's history. They will enter at the group stage.

First team squad
As of 1 September, 2014

Out on loan

Transfers

In

Out

Competitions

Bundesliga

League table

Results summary

Results by round

Matches

DFB-Pokal

References

FC Augsburg seasons
Augsburg